Aachen West station is a railway station in Aachen on the railway lines Aachen – Mönchengladbach and Aachen-West – Tongeren.

Services 
All regional trains stop at this station, so it is usually served four times per hour and direction.

External links

 Map of Aachen West station 
 Current departures

References

Railway stations in North Rhine-Westphalia
West station
Railway stations in Germany opened in 1853